The Kill Order is a 2012 young adult dystopian science fiction novel written by American author James Dashner and published on August 14, 2012, by Delacorte Press. It is the first prequel book in The Maze Runner series and the fourth  installment overall. The book is set prior to the events of The Fever Code and 13 years before The Maze Runner book.

Plot
In the prologue, Thomas goes through the Swipe and is put in the Box, as he is one of the candidates who is needed inside. He is told that Teresa will get the Swipe as well. Thomas is then sent into the Maze with Teresa, setting the events of The Maze Runner in motion.

Set thirteen years before the prologue and the events of The Maze Runner, the main story of the novel begins in New York City, when the world is hit by catastrophic solar flares.

Mark and Trina form an alliance with Alec, Lana, and others, who rescue them from a group of street urchins. The group flees to the fictional Lincoln Building to avoid an impending tsunami. The Tsunami ends up being made of searing hot water due to the solar flare, killing most of the survivors in New York and giving Mark PTSD. They camp out in the building for weeks until a yacht arrives, but the yacht's crew takes them hostage and kills one of them in order to persuade them to give up all the food in the Lincoln building. Alec manages to overcome their captors, and they take the yacht as their own and pilot the boat to the Appalachian Beaches.

The story resumes one year after the tsunami near Asheville, a small North Carolina town in which Mark, Trina, Alec, and Lana now live. Huge helicopter-like vehicles, called Bergs, arrive and attack the people in the towns. The crew showers their settlement with darts that kill many townies. Alec and Mark manage to subdue and take over a Berg, but its pilot crashes the vehicle in order to avoid answering their questions. They discover that the darts contained a deadly virus, and they start their long journey back to their town.

Three days later, they reach the town to find that the virus had killed most of the infected. Lana and Trina explain that after the initial death toll, people started living a little longer before they die, and symptoms of infection also changed. Mark and Alec explain that the darts were filled with a virus, and the group suspects that the virus is mutating.

Trina and Lana take Mark and Alec to a locked room in which one of their other friends, Darnell, is confined. Increasingly sick, he had started having hallucinations, apparently from the virus, and begged Trina and Lana to lock him up, which they did. Their friend started saying that "they" were in his brain and eating it away. He kept repeating that "they" were going to eat at his head until nothing was left. He suddenly starts banging his head against a wall to silence "them" and ends up killing himself.

Another girl, Misty, who was his friend goes into the room and comes out reporting a headache that alarms Mark and Alec. They tell Lana and Trina to lock her up as well. Immediately after they confine, she starts acting just like her dead friend by talking about "them," and she starts to sing an eerie song about death.

Mark and Alec take Lana and Trina to find the mysterious attackers' base. The group passes through an abandoned village where they meet a five-year-old girl, Deedee, who they take with them. She tells them that just like their own settlement, her village was attacked months earlier. The people turned crazy and left her behind. She shows the group a puncture mark that alarms Alec, who tells the group that Deedee must be infected. They decide to take her with them anyway since if she had no symptoms months after she had been infected by the virus, she was obviously immune to it.

Traveling to find the attackers' base, Mark and Alec leave the group for a while to investigate a loud noise. They encounter a cult of infected people that believes that since Deedee is immune to the virus, unlike them, she must be some sort of demon. Mark and Alec manage to escape from the cult but find that a forest fire has been started and that Trina, Lana, and Deedee are gone from their campsite. Believing that the three girls in their party must have escaped and gone ahead of them to the attackers' base, Mark and Alec continue on to the site.

They arrive at the base and sneak into what appears to be the site of the Post-Flares Coalition (PFC). They eavesdrop on a conversation and realize that the disease is widely known as "the Flare" and caused by a virus that shuts down the thinking part of people's brains. They also learn that the girls were given back to the infected cult. They are caught eavesdropping but manage to escape and steal a Berg. Mark and Alec find weapons inside the Berg; the transvices are guns that evaporate people's molecules. They recharge one to use so that they can battle the infected. Mark realizes that the Flare has started to affect his mind.

Their journey in the Berg takes them near Asheville, where they find Lana suffering badly from torture by the infected. To end her suffering, Alec must kill her with the transvice. They find Trina and Deedee at an old house, but Mark realizes that Trina also has the Flare and has forgotten him. They are attacked by the infected but manage to escape to the Berg. As Mark starts to lose his sanity, he recognizes that Deedee is truly immune to the virus and should be sent to the safety of the PFC base in Alaska. Mark plans on delivering Deedee by using a teleporter, called a flat trans, inside a PFC base in the safe part of Asheville. As they travel, they find that Alec is also dying from the Flare.

Mark and Trina manage to bring Deedee to the flat trans and send her through it to safety at the Alaska PFC base. Mark orders Alec to crash the Berg into the flat trans building to prevent the infected from escaping Asheville. Trina remembers Mark, and they kiss just as the Berg crashes, killing everyone in the base and destroying the flat trans.

In the book's epilogue, two years later, authorities from WICKED take a little boy, Stephen, away from his mother, because he is immune to the virus. They rename him Thomas. In the second epilogue, Deedee is revealed to be Teresa from the original trilogy, who sees the infected as worthy of saving due to her experience with Mark, Trina, and Alec, who tried to save her and the world in spite of suffering from the infection. When she first meets Thomas, on the other hand, Thomas tells her that he was grateful to escape his infected parents.

Characters 
 Mark: A 17-year-old young man who survived the onslaught of the Flare and finds himself living with his neighbor Trina and war veterans Alec and Lana, along with a few others in the Appalachians. After a Berg releases the Flare virus that kills everyone but the four, Mark embarks on a journey to take revenge against those who ordered the execution.
 Alec: A war veteran who came to rescue Mark and Trina shortly before a giant tsunami caused by the melting polar ice caps hit New York City. He and Lana have since become the two teenagers' companions since a year before the novel begins.
 Trina: Mark's neighbor and love interest who was with him when the Flare first hit the Earth and has since lived together with other survivors in a small village in the Appalachians.
 Lana: A war nurse who has a close relationship with Alec. The two accompany Mark and Trina ever since the onslaught of the Flare and the immediate tsunami that devastated New York City. She is the first of the four to succumb to the Flare virus.
 Deedee / Teresa: A 5-year-old girl whom Mark, Alec, Trina, and Lana, find in a deserted neighboring village. She is immune to the Flare virus, a status which is demonized by her fellow villagers. Due to this, Mark decides to send her to the Post-Flare Coalition (PFC) base in Alaska, where she would be renamed Teresa Agnes. A grown Teresa is also shown in the prologue of the novel, where she becomes a witness to Thomas being delivered to the Maze. 
 Anton: A worker for the PFC who tells Mark and Alec about the way the Flare virus is spread. He also tells them that he and his coworkers plan to move to the PFC base in Alaska, which gives Mark the idea to send Deedee there.
 Bruce: A worker for the PFC who had a hand in releasing the Flare virus in return for food for him and his coworkers. He complains about the restrictions put into the cure for the virus by the PFC base in Alaska.
 Jed: A bald and earless man who is part of the villagers of Deedee's village. He prevents Mark and Alec from being killed and recounts to them about the Flare virus which destroyed his village two months and three days before. He subsequently dies due to the virus. 
 Toad, Misty, and Darnell: Three survivors of the Flare who are together referred to as "The Three Stooges". They live alongside Mark, Alec, Trina, and Lana, in the makeshift village in the Appalachians. Darnell is the first casualty of the Flare virus released by a Berg to their village. Misty is found to be infected just after Mark and Alec return from hijacking the Berg. After Toad puts an end to her misery, he is infected too and Alec kills him out of mercy.
 Baxter: A 13-year-old boy who was part of the original group of survivors who survived the tsunami that hit New York City, alongside Mark, Trina, Alec, and Lana. When they camped out at the Lincoln Building, Baxter was killed by a man called Boss. He only appears in flashbacks.
 Boss: A scavenger who ambushed Mark, Trina, Alec, Lana, Baxter, Toad, Misty and Darnell in the Lincoln Building. After killing Baxter, he threatened them to give him supplies. Mark managed to kick him off to the waters and took control of his vehicle. His female companion then committed suicide. He only appears in flashbacks.
 John Michael: The current chancellor of World in Catastrophe: Killzone Experiment Department (WICKED), the company that approved the population control suggested by Katie McVoy to eradicate half of the world population using the Flare virus. He is mentioned in a letter found by Mark in Randall Spilker's workpad.
 Randall Spilker and Ladena Lichliter: Two members of WICKED who disapproved the method suggested by Katie McVoy to kill half of the population by the VC321xb47 virus, seeing that its mutation is unpredictable. They are only mentioned in correspondence letters found by Mark in Spilker's workpad.
 Katie McVoy: A member of WICKED who suggested to chancellor Michael a form of population control by killing half of the population with the VC321xb47 virus, referred to as the Flare virus; thus, she is indirectly responsible for most of the events in the series. She is only mentioned in a letter in Randall Spilker's workpad found by Mark.
 Thomas: A 5-year-old boy immune to the Flare virus who is taken by WICKED from his willing mother in the epilogue of the novel. A member of WICKED decides to name him after Thomas Edison after seeing a light bulb in his house. A grown Thomas is also mentioned in the prologue of the novel from the point of view of Teresa, just before he takes his entry to the Maze.

Reception
Critical reception for The Kill Order was mostly positive. Publishers Weekly and KidzWorld both gave positive reviews for the book, with Publishers Weekly noting that fans of the main Maze Runner series would enjoy it.

Sequel
On September 27, 2016, a sequel to The Kill Order was released, titled The Fever Code; taking place between the events of The Kill Order and The Maze Runner.

References

External links
 

2012 American novels
Books by James Dashner
The Maze Runner